Minuscule 302 (in the Gregory-Aland numbering), α 302 (Soden), is a Greek minuscule manuscript of the New Testament, on parchment. Palaeographically it has been assigned to the 11th century. The manuscript is lacunose. 
Formerly it was labelled by 11a and 140p.

Description 

The codex contains the text of the Acts of the Apostles, Catholic epistles, and Pauline epistles on 333 parchment leaves with lacunae (Acts 2:20-31; 1 Corinthians 12:17-13:2; Hebrews 11:35-13:25). The text is written in one column per page, in 18 lines per page.

It contains Prolegomena, with scholia. The Hebrews is placed between 2 Thessalonians and 1 Timothy. 
The text of Hebrews 11:35-12:1 was supplied by a later hand.

Text 

The Greek text of the codex is a representative of the Byzantine text-type. Aland placed it in Category V.

History 

Wettstein slightly examined Acts of the Apostles and Catholic epistles of the manuscript. Reiche and Scholz examined Pauline epistles. The manuscript was also examined by Paulin Martin and C. R. Gregory, who saw the manuscript in 1885.

Formerly it was labelled by 11a and 140p. In 1908 Gregory gave number 302 for it.

The manuscript is currently housed at the Bibliothèque nationale de France (Gr. 103) at Paris.

See also 

 List of New Testament minuscules
 Biblical manuscript
 Textual criticism

References

Further reading 

 Reiche, Codices Manuscripti Novi Testamenti, Göttingen 1847, pp. 30–35

Greek New Testament minuscules
11th-century biblical manuscripts
Bibliothèque nationale de France collections